Ocean of Wisdom (born March 8, 1997) is a retired Thoroughbred racehorse, bred by the Niarchos family, who also bred champion race horses such as Bago, Dream Well, Miesque, Six Perfections and Divine Proportions.

His sire is top stallion Mr. Prospector. Ocean of Wisdom's dam is Coup de Folie, herself a group one winner and dam of three G1 winners in Machiavellian, Exit to Nowhere and Coup de Genie.

During his racing career, Ocean of Wisdom was trained by Pascal Bary and ridden by Cash Asmussen. Ocean of Wisdom was a Group 3 winner as a two-year-old, winning the Prix La Rochette. His racing career ended after five races due to an injury during training, and he was retired to stud at Niarchos family's Haras de Fresnay-le-Buffard, where he continues to stand.

Pedigree

References
 Ocean of Wisdom at Haras de Fresnay-le-Buffard,
 Ocean of Wisdom's pedigree and racing stats

1997 racehorse births
Thoroughbred family 2-d
Racehorses bred in France
Racehorses trained in France